The Battle of Mucellium was an engagement in 542 near Mugello, Italy, between Ostrogoths and Byzantines during the Gothic War. Having lifted a siege of Florence, the Ostrogoths led by Totila turned on the pursuing Byzantines, defeating their numerically superior force.

Following his success against the Byzantines in the Battle of Faventia in spring 542, Totila sent part of his troops to attack Florence. Justin, the Byzantine commander of Florence, had neglected to adequately provision the city against a siege, and hurriedly sent for aid to the other Byzantine commanders in the area: John, Bessas and Cyprian. They gathered their forces and came to the relief of Florence. At their approach, the Goths raised the siege and retreated north, to the region of Mucellium (modern Mugello). The Byzantines pursued them, with John and his troops leading the chase and the rest of the army following behind. Suddenly, the Goths rushed upon John's men from the top of a hill. The Byzantines initially held, but soon a rumour spread that their general had fallen, and they broke and fled towards the oncoming main Byzantine force. Their panic however was caught by the latter as well, and the entire Byzantine army dispersed in disorder. The Goths took many captives, who were treated well and even induced to join the Gothic army, while the Byzantine generals fled to isolated strongholds (Bessas to Spoleto, Justin back to Florence, Cyprian to Perugia and John to Rome), and henceforth failed to cooperate against the Goths.

Sources

542
Mucellium
Mucellium
Mucellium
Mucellium
Mucellium
540s in the Byzantine Empire